Folkland may refer to:
 Folkland (Swedish provinces), the original Swedish provinces of Tiundaland, Attundaland, Fjärdhundraland, and Roden (Roslagen) which in 1296 united to form the modern province of Uppland
 A type of land tenure under Anglo-Saxon law: see bookland (law)

See also
Falkland (disambiguation)
Falklands